Piotr is a Polish given name that is equivalent to the English name, Peter. In 2009, Piotr was one of the three most popular male names in Poland.

Give name only
Piotr I (bishop of Wrocław) (died 1111), Polish Catholic priest
Piotr I Półkozic (died c. 1239), bishop of Płock
Piotr of Bogoria and Skotnik (died 1283), Polish nobleman
Piotr of Goniądz (c. 1525–1573), Polish political and religious writer
Piotr of Grudziądz (1392–c. 1480), Polish medieval composer
Piotr of Klecia (born c. 1329), Polish knight and courtier

A
Piotr Abramowicz (1619–1697), Polish Jesuit
Piotr Abraszewski (1905–1996), Polish painter
Piotr Adamczyk (born 1972), Polish actor
Piotr Alberti (1913–1994), Soviet and Russian painter
Piotr Albiński (born 1969), Polish freestyle swimmer
Piotr Anderszewski (born 1969), Polish pianist and composer
Piotr Andrejew (1947–2017), Polish film director and screenwriter
Piotr Azikiewicz (born 1995), Polish professional footballer

B
Piotr Badura (born 1995), Polish volleyball player
Piotr Bagnicki (born 1980), Polish footballer
Piotr Bajdziak (born 1984), Polish footballer
Piotr Bajor (born 1960), Polish film actor
Piotr Bajtlik (born 1982), Polish actor and voiceover talent
Piotr Balcerowicz (fl. 1990s–2010s), Polish orientalist, philosopher, professor
Piotr Balcerzak (born 1975), Polish sprint athlete
Piotr Banasiak (born 1987), Polish association football goalkeeper
Piotr Banaszak (born 1964), Polish Olympic weightlifter
Piotr Bania (born 1973), Polish football player
Piotr Bartkowiak (born 1975), Polish football player
Piotr Baryka (1600–1675), Polish soldier and writer
Piotr Basta (born 1970), Polish rower
Piotr Bazler (born 1981), Polish footballer
Piotr Bańka (born 1964), Polish doctor and politician
Piotr Beczała (born 1966), Polish operatic tenor
Piotr Belousov (1912–1989), Soviet and Russian painter
Piotr Bielak (born 1976), Polish footballer
Piotr Bielczyk (born 1952), Polish javelin thrower
Piotr Bieliński (born 1948), Swiss-born Polish Mediterranean archaeologist
Piotr Ignacy Bieńkowski (1865–1925), Polish classical scholar and archaeologist
Piotr Biesiekirski (born 2001), Polish motorcycle racer
Piotr Bikont (1955–2017), Polish journalist, publicist, culinary critic and theatre director
Piotr Bobras (born 1977), Polish chess grandmaster
Piotr Bochenek (born 1975), Polish rower
Piotr Bojańczyk (born 1946), Polish ice dancer
Piotr Borodin (1905–1986), Soviet politician
Piotr Borys (born 1976), Polish politician
Piotr Brol (1944–2001), Polish footballer
Piotr Bronowicki (born 1981), Polish footballer
Piotr Brożek (born 1983), Polish footballer
Piotr Brożyna (born 1995), Polish racing cyclist
Piotr Bruzda (1946–1997), Polish speedway rider
Piotr Bryhadzin (1949-2021), Belarusian historian and politician
Piotr Brzoza (born 1966), Polish footballer
Piotr Brzózka (born 1989), Polish cross-country mountain biker
Piotr Buchalski (born 1981), Polish rower
Piotr Buchkin (1886–1965), Soviet and Russian painter
Piotr Buciarski (born 1975), Danish pole vaulter
Piotr Bujnarowski (born 1972), Polish rower
Piotr Bujnowicz (born 1973), Polish photographer
Piotr Bukowski (born 1963), German water polo player
Piotr Burlikowski (born 1970), Polish footballer

C
Piotr Całbecki (born 1967), Polish politician
Piotr Celeban (born 1985), Polish footballer
Piotr Cetnarowicz (born 1973), Polish footballer
Piotr Grigoryevich Chernyshev (1712–1773), Russian Imperial nobleman
Piotr Chmielewski (born 1970), Polish racing cyclist
Piotr Chmielowski (1848–1904), Polish philosopher, literary historian and critic
Piotr Choynowski (1885–1935), Polish writer, novelist and translator
Piotr Chrapkowski (born 1988), Polish handball player
Piotr Chvertko (1915–?), Soviet politician and intelligence officer
Piotr Cieśla (born 1955), Polish handball player
Piotr Cugowski (born 1979), Polish musician
Piotr Ćwielong (born 1986), Polish footballer
Piotr Cybulski (born 1955), Polish politician
Piotr Cywiński (born 1972), director of the Auschwitz-Birkenau State Museum
Piotr Czachowski (born 1966), Polish footballer
Piotr Czaczka (born 1958), Polish handball player
Piotr Czaja (born 1944), Polish footballer
Piotr Michał Czartoryski (1909–1993), Polish nobleman
Piotr Czauderna (born 1962), Polish government official
Piotr Czech (born 1986), Polish gridiron football player
Piotr Czerkawski (born 1989), Polish film critic
Piotr Czerniawski (born 1976), Polish poet

D
Piotr Damasiewicz (born 1980), Polish composer
Piotr Danielak (1913–1969), Polish footballer
Piotr Daniluk (born 1982), Polish sports shooter
Piotr Edward Dankowski (1908–1942), Polish Catholic saint
Piotr Darmochwał (born 1991), Polish footballer
Piotr Domaradzki (1946–2015), Polish-born American journalist, essayist and historian
Piotr Dominiak (born 1948), Polish economist and professor
Piotr Drzewiecki (multiple people)
Piotr Dumała (born 1956), Polish film director and animator
Piotr Dunin (c. 1415–1484), leader in the Kingdom of Poland
Piotr Dziewicki (born 1979), Polish footballer
Piotr Dłucik (born 1954), Polish swimmer
Piotr Długosielski (born 1977), Polish sprinter

E-F
Piotr Eberhardt (1935–2020), Polish geographer and professor
Piotr Farfał (born 1978), Polish rightwing politician
Piotr Fast (born 1951), Polish professor and historian of Russian literature
Piotr Feliks (1883–1941), Polish political, social and education activist
Piotr Fijas (born 1958), Polish ski jumper
Piotr Firlej (died 1553), Polish nobleman
Piotr Florczyk (born 1978), Polish poet, translator, essayist, and critic
Piotr Fronczewski (born 1946), Polish actor and singer

G
Piotr Gabrych (born 1972), Polish volleyball player
Piotr Gacek (born 1978), Polish volleyball player
Piotr Gadzinowski (born 1957), Polish leftist politician
Piotr Gajewski (born 1959), Polish politician, artistic director, and conductor
Piotr Gamrat (1487–1545), Polish archbishop
Piotr Gąsowski (born 1964), Polish actor, comedian, and presenter
Piotr Gawroński (born 1990), Polish racing cyclist
Piotr Gawryś (born 1955), Swiss bridge player
Piotr Gawęcki (born 1989), Polish footballer 
Piotr Gembicki (1585–1657),  Polish–Lithuanian public official and bishop
Piotr Gierczak (born 1976), Polish football manager
Piotr Giro (born 1974), Swedish actor, dancer, and choreographer
Piotr Giza (born 1980), Polish footballer
Piotr Gładki (1972–2005), Polish long-distance runner
Piotr Gliński (born 1954), Polish sociologist and politician
Piotr Głowacki (born 1980), Polish actor
Piotr Gontarczyk (born 1970), Polish historian
Piotr Grabarczyk (born 1982), Polish handball player
Piotr Greger (born 1964), Polish Roman Catholic bishop
Piotr Grudzień (1712–1773), Russian Imperial nobleman, diplomat
Piotr Grudziński (1975–2016), Polish musician
Piotr Gruszka (born 1977), Polish volleyball player and coach
Piotr Gryszkiewicz (born 2001), Polish association football player
Piotr Grzelczak (born 1988), Polish footballer
Piotr Gurzęda (born 1987), Polish footballer
Piotr Gutman (born 1941), Polish boxer

H
Piotr Haczek (born 1977), Polish track and field athlete 
Piotr Hain (born 1991), Polish volleyball player
Piotr Hallmann (born 1987), Polish mixed martial artist
Piotr Haren (born 1970), Danish footballer
Piotr Havik (born 1994), Dutch racing cyclist
Piotr Hertel (1936–2010), Polish music composer and pianist
Piotr Hofmański (born 1956), Polish jurist and judge who served as President of the International Criminal Court
Piotr Hojka (born 1984), Polish rower

I-J
Piotr Ianulov (born 1986), Moldovan freestyle wrestler
Piotr Ikonowicz (born 1956), Polish politician
Piotr Indyk (fl. 1990s–2010s), Polish-born American professor of computer science and mathematics
Piotr Iwanicki (born 1984), Polish wheelchair dance competitor
Piotr Iwaszkiewicz (1959–2021), Polish political historian, translator and diplomat
Piotr Jabłkowski (born 1958), Polish fencer
Piotr Jabłoński (born 1975), Polish wrestler
Piotr Janas (born 1970), Polish artist
Piotr Janowski (1951–2008), Polish violinist
Piotr Jarecki (born 1955), Polish prelate of the Catholic Church
Piotr Jarosiewicz (born 1998), Polish handball player
Piotr Jaroszewicz (1909–1992), post-World War II Polish political figure
Piotr Jędraszczyk (born 2001), Polish handball player
Piotr Jegor (born 1968), Polish footballer
Piotr Johansson (born 1995), Swedish footballer
Piotr Juszczak (born 1988), Polish rower

K
Piotr Ibrahim Kalwas (born 1963), Polish novelist and journalist
Piotr Kamrowski (born 1967), Polish judoka
Piotr Kantor (born 1992), Polish Olympic volleyball player
Piotr Karasinski (fl. 1970s–2020s), Polish quantitative analyst
Piotr Karpienia (born 1979), Polish singer-songwriter
Piotr Kasperkiewicz (born 1989), Polish cyclist
Piotr Kędzia (born 1984), Polish sprinter
Piotr Kieruzel (born 1988), Polish footballer
Piotr Kiełpikowski (born 1962), Polish fencer
Piotr Kirpsza (born 1989), Polish cyclist
Piotr Kiszka (died 1534), Lithuania nobleman
Piotr Klepczarek (born 1982), Polish footballer
Piotr Klepczarek (footballer, born 1984), Polish footballer
Piotr Klimczak (born 1980), Polish sprinter
Piotr Blastus Kmita (died c. 1632), Polish-Lithuanian Protestant printer and writer
Piotr Kochanowski (1566–1620), Polish nobleman, poet, and translator
Piotr Kocąb (born 1952), Polish football manager
Piotr Kolc (born 1987), Polish footballer
Piotr Kołodziejczyk (1939–2019), Polish Minister of National Defence
Piotr Koman (born 1985), Polish footballer
Piotr Konieczka (1901–1939), Polish Army soldier
Piotr Kosewicz (born 1974), Polish para-athlete and biathlete
Piotr Kosiba (1855–1939), Polish friar
Piotr Kosiorowski (born 1981), Polish footballer
Piotr Kosmatko (born 1952), Polish sports shooter
Piotr Kowalski (1927–2004), Polish artist, sculptor, and architect
Piotr Kozieradzki (born 1970), Polish musician and drummer
Piotr Krawczyk (born 1994), Polish footballer
Piotr Kraśko (born 1971), Polish journalist, theatrologist, and television presenter
Piotr Marek Król (born 1974), Polish politician
Piotr Krzywicki (1964–2009), Polish politician
Piotr Kuczera (born 1995), Polish judoka
Piotr Kuklis (born 1986), Polish footballer
Piotr Kula (born 1987), Polish sailor
Piotr Kuleta (born 1989), Polish sprint canoeist
Piotr Kulpaka (born 1984), Polish footballer
Piotr Kuncewicz (1936–2007), Polish writer and freemason
Piotr Kurbiel (born 1996), Polish professional footballer 
Piotr Kurpios (born 1963), Polish politician
Piotr Kwasigroch (born 1962), Polish ice hockey player and coach

L
Piotr Łabędź (died 1198), Roman Catholic bishop
Piotr Lachert (1938–2018), Polish composer, pianist and teacher
Piotr Langosz (born 1951), Polish basketball player
Piotr Lech (born 1968), Polish football goalkeeper 
Piotr Leciejewski (born 1985), Polish football goalkeeper
Piotr Lenar (born 1958), Polish cinematographer
Piotr Lenartowicz (1934–2012), Polish philosopher and professor
Piotr Libera (born 1951), Polish bishop
Piotr Libicz (fl. 1980s–2000s), Polish-born Canadian soccer player
Piotr Lipiński (born 1979), Polish volleyball player
Piotr Lisek (born 1992), Polish athlete specialising in the pole vault
Piotr Lisiecki (born 1993), Polish singer and guitarist
Piotr Litvinsky (1927–2009), Russian Soviet realist painter and art teacher
Piotr Łossowski (born 1925), Polish historian and professor
Piotr Łukasiewicz (born 1972), Polish diplomat
Piotr Łukasik (born 1994), Polish volleyball player

M
Piotr Machalica (1955–2020), Polish actor
Piotr Madejski (born 1983), Polish footballer 
Piotr Małachowski (born 1983), Polish discus thrower
Piotr Malarczyk (born 1991), Polish footballer
Piotr Malinowski (born 1984), Polish footballer
Piotr Mandrysz (born 1962), Polish football manager
Piotr Markiewicz (born 1973), Polish sprint canoeist
Piotr Masłowski (born 1988), Polish handball player
Piotr Mazur (born 1982), Canadian-born Polish road bicycle racer
Piotr Mazur (canoeist) (born 1991), Polish sprint canoeist
Piotr Michalik (born 1957), Polish bantamweight Greco-Roman wrestler
Piotr Michalski (born 1994), Polish speed skater
Piotr Michałowski (1800–1855), Polish artist
Piotr Midloch (fl. 1990s), Polish sprint canoeist
Piotr Mieszkowski (died 1652), Polish bishop suffragan
Piotr Mieszkowski (Junior) (1630–1696), Polish Roman Catholic prelate
Piotr Migoń (fl. 2010s–2020s), Polish geomorphologist
Piotr Mikuła (born 1976), Polish field hockey player
Piotr Misztal (born 1965), Polish politician
Piotr Misztal (footballer) (born 1987), Polish footballer
Piotr Molenda (born 1962), Polish table tennis player
Piotr Morawski (1976–2009), Polish mountaineer
Piotr Paweł Morta (born 1959), Polish political activist and dissident
Piotr Moss (born 1949), Polish composer
Piotr Moszczynski (fl. 1990s–2000s), Polish Paralympic volleyball player
Piotr Mosór (born 1974), Polish footballer
Piotr Mowlik (born 1951), Polish footballer
Piotr Mroziński (born 1992), Polish footballer
Piotr Müller (born 1989), Polish politician and lawyer
Piotr Murdzia (born 1975), Polish chess master
Piotr Myśliwiec (born 1952), Polish diplomat and chemist
Piotr Myszka (born 1981), Polish windsurfer
Piotr Myszkowski (multiple people)

N
Piotr Naimski (born 1951), Polish politician and academic
Piotr Naszarkowski (born 1952), Polish engraver
Piotr Nawrot (born 1955), Polish Roman Catholic priest and musicologist
Piotr Nazarov (1921–1988), Soviet and Russian painter and art teacher
Piotr Nierychło (1921–1976), Polish footballer and manager
Piotr Nowak (born 1964), Polish footballer
Piotr Nowakowski (born 1987), Polish volleyball player
Piotr Tomasz Nowakowski (born 1974), Polish religious researcher
Piotr Nowina-Konopka (born 1949), Polish academic, politician, and diplomat
Piotr Nurowski (1945–2010), Polish tennis player

O
Piotr Ogrodziński (born 1951), Polish diplomat, activist and philosopher
Piotr Olewiński (born 1968), Polish windsurfer
Piotr Olszewski (born 1973), Polish rower
Piotr Opaliński (1586–1624), Polish–Lithuanian nobleman
Piotr Opaliński (diplomat) (born 1958) Polish diplomat
Piotr Orczyk (born 1993), Polish volleyball player
Piotr Orliński (born 1976), Polish footballer
Piotr Orslowski (born 1974), Polish luger
Piotr Orzechowski (born 1990), Polish jazz pianist and composer
Piotr Osiecki (born 1961), Polish politician and rugby union footballer
Piotr Ostaszewski (born 1964), Polish historian
Piotr Ożarowski (1725–1794), Polish nobleman, politician, and military commander

P
Piotr Pac (after 1570–1642), Polish-Lithuanian nobleman
Piotr Pakhomkin (born 1985) is a Russian-American classical guitarist
Piotr Paleczny (born 1946), Polish classical pianist
Piotr Parasiewicz (fl. 1980s–2010s), Austrian-American river professor
Piotr Parczewski (1590–1658), Polish-Lithuanian Roman Catholic bishop
Piotr Parzyszek (born 1993), Polish footballer
Piotr Pawlicki (multiple people)
Piotr Pawłowski (born 1959), Polish sprint canoer
Piotr Pawłowski (actor) (1925–2012), Polish actor
Piotr Pawlukiewicz (1960–2020), Polish Roman Catholic priest
Piotr Paziński (multiple people)
Piotr Perkowski (1901–1990), Polish composer
Piotr Petasz (born 1984), Polish footballer
Piotr Piasecki (born 1952), Polish equestrian
Piotr Piątek (born 1982), Polish archer
Piotr Piechniak (born 1977), Polish footballer
Piotr Piecuch (born 1960), Polish-born American physical chemist
Piotr Piekarski (multiple people)
Piotr Pierzchała (born 1999), Polish footballer
Piotr Plewnia (born 1977), Polish footballer
Piotr Polczak (born 1986), Polish footballer
Piotr Polk (born 1962), Polish actor and singer
Piotr Ponikowski (born 1961), Polish cardiologist
Piotr Popik (born 1962), Polish neuropsychopharmacologist
Piotr Potworowski (1898–1962), Polish painter and designer
Piotr Protasiewicz (born 1975), Polish speedway rider
Piotr Przybecki (born 1972), Polish handball player and coach
Piotr Przydział (born 1974), Polish racing cyclist
Piotr Prędota (born 1982), Polish footballer
Piotr Pręgowski (born 1954), Polish actor
Piotr Pustelnik (born 1951), Polish alpine and high-altitude climber
Piotr Pyrdoł (born 1999), Polish professional footballer
Piotr Pytlakowski (born 1951), Polish journalist and screenwriter

R
Piotr Wysz Radoliński (c. 1354–1414), Polish bishop 
Piotr Radziszewski (born 1970), Polish urologist
Piotr Rajkiewicz (born 1967), Polish footballer
Piotr Reiss (born 1972), Polish footballer
Piotr Robakowski (born 1990), Polish footballer
Piotr Rocki (1974–2020), Polish footballer
Piotr Rogucki (born 1978), Polish singer, musician, and actor
Piotr Romke (born 1959), Polish footballer
Piotr Rubik (born 1968), Polish composer
Piotr Ruszkul (born 1985), Polish footballer
Piotr Rychlik (born 1984), Polish diplomat
Piotr Rysiukiewicz (born 1974), Polish sprinter
Piotr Rzepka (born 961), Polish footballer

S
Piotr Salaber (born 1966), Polish composer, conductor, and pianist
Piotr Samiec-Talar (born 2001), Polish footballer
Piotr Sarata (fl. 1980s), Polish slalom canoeist
Piotr Sawczuk (born 1962), Polish Roman Catholic bishop
Piotr Semenenko (1814–1886), Polish theologian of the Roman Catholic Church
Piotr Setkiewicz (born 1963), Polish historian
Piotr Siemionowski (born 1988), Polish sprint canoeist
Piotr Skarga (1536–1612), Polish Jesuit, preacher, hagiographer, and polemicist
Piotr Skiba (born 1982), Polish football goalkeeper
Piotr Skierski (born 1971), Polish table tennis player
Piotr Skowron (born 1985), Polish professor of Computer science
Piotr Skowyrski (fl. 2010s), better known as Izak, Polish esports commentator and social media personality
Piotr Skrobowski (born 1961), Polish footballer
Piotr Skrzynecki (1930–1997), Polish choreographer, director and cabaret impresari
Piotr Skuratowicz (1891–1940), Polish general
Piotr Słonimski (1922–2009), Polish-born French geneticist
Piotr Ślusarczyk (born 1979), Polish politician
Piotr Śmietański (1899–1950), Polish non-commissioned officer and communist functionary
Piotr Smoleński (died 1942), Polish cryptographer
Piotr Snopek (born 1991), Polish pair skater
Piotr Kmita Sobieński (1477–1553), Polish nobleman
Piotr Sobociński (1958–2001), Polish cinematographer
Piotr Sobotta (born 1940), Polish high jumper
Piotr Soczyński (born 1967), Polish footballer
Piotr Sowisz (born 1971), Polish footballer
Piotr Stachiewicz (1858–1938), Polish painter and illustrator
Piotr Starzyński (born 2004), Polish footballer
Piotr Stawarczyk (born 1983), Polish footballer
Piotr Stańczak (c. 1966–2009), Polish geologist
Piotr Steinkeller (1799–1854), Polish entrepreneur
Piotr Stępień (born 1963), Polish wrestler
Piotr Stoiński (multiple people)
Piotr Stokowiec (born 1963), Polish wrestler
Piotr Świderski (born 1983), Polish speedway rider
Piotr Świerczewski (born 1972), Polish footballer
Piotr Świst (born 1968), Polish speedway rider
Piotr Świtalski (born 1957), Polish diplomat
Piotr Suski (1942–2009), Polish footballer
Piotr Szarek (1908–1939), Polish Catholic clergyman
Piotr Szarpak (born 1971), Polish footballer
Piotr Szczechowicz (born 1976), Polish football manager
Piotr Szczepanik (1942–2020), Polish singer
Piotr Szczepański (born 1988), Polish canoeist
Piotr Szczotka (born 1981), Polish basketball player
Piotr Szczypa (born 1948), Polish figure skater and figure skating coach
Piotr Szczęsny (1963–2017), Polish chemist
Piotr Sztompka (born 1944), Polish sociologist
Piotr Szulczewski (born 1981), Polish businessman and computer engineer
Piotr Szulkin (1950–2018), Polish film director and writer
Piotr Szyhalski (born 1967), Polish-born multimedia artist in the United States
Piotr Szymiczek (born 1982), Polish footballer

T-V
Piotr Fergusson Tepper (1713–1794), Polish–Lithuanian banker
Piotr Tobolski (born 1958), Polish rower
Piotr Tomasik (born 1987), Polish footballer
Piotr Tomaszewski (born 1974), Polish classical guitarist
Piotr Tomicki (1464–1535), Polish Roman Catholic bishop
Piotr Trafarski (born 1983), Polish footballer
Piotr Triebler (1898–1952), Polish sculptor
Piotr Trochowski (born 1984), Polish-born German footballer
Piotr Trzaskalski (born 1964), Polish film director and screenwriter
Piotr Tworek (born 1975), Polish football manager
Piotr Tyszkiewicz (born 1970), Polish footballer
Piotr Ugrumov (born 1961), Russian cyclist
Piotr Uklański (born 1968), Polish-American]] artist
Piotr Uszok (born 1955), Polish politician
Piotr Vasiliev (1909–1989), Russian Soviet realist painter

W
Piotr Wadecki (born 1973), Polish professional road racing cyclist
Piotr Waglowski (born 1974), Polish lawyer, poet, publicist, webmaster, and open government activist
Piotr Wala (1936–2013), Polish ski jumper
Piotr S. Wandycz (1923–2017), Polish-American historian
Piotr Wawryniuk (born 1943), Polish equestrian
Piotr Wawrzeniuk (born 1971), Polish historian and musician
Piotr Wawrzyniak (1849–1910), Polish priest and activist
Piotr Wiaderek (born 1984), Polish sprinter
Piotr Wilczek (born 1962), Polish intellectual historian
Piotr Wilczewski (born 1978), Polish boxer
Piotr Wilniewczyc (1887–1960), Polish engineer and arms designer
Piotr Witasik (born 1992), Polish footballer
Piotr Wiwczarek (born 1965), Polish musician
Piotr Więcek (born 1990), Polish drifting driver
Piotr Wiśniewski (born 1982), Polish footballer
Piotr Wiśnik (born 1950), Polish football manager
Piotr Odmieniec Włast (1876–1949), Polish writer
Piotr Wlazło (born 1989), Polish footballer
Piotr Włodarczyk (born 1977), Polish footballer
Piotr Włostowic (1080–1153), Polish nobleman
Piotr Wójcik (born 1965), Polish athlete specialising in sprint hurdles
Piotr Wojdyga (born 1962), Polish football goalkeeper
Piotr Wojtczak (born 1963), Polish diplomat
Piotr Dunin Wolski (1531–1590), Polish–Lithuanian-born bishop and diplomat
Piotr Woźniak (multiple people)
Piotr Wróbel (born 1953), Polish-Canadian historian
Piotr Wysocki (1797–1875), Polish captain and leader of the Polish conspiracy against Russian Tsar Nicolas I
Piotr Wyszomirski (born 1988), Polish handball player

Z
Piotr Zajlich (1884–1948), Polish dancer and choreographer
Piotr Zajączkowski (born 1966), Polish footballer and manager
Piotr Zak, fictional Polish composer created by BBC producers as part of a hoax broadcast
Piotr Zaradny (born 1972), Polish racing cyclist
Piotr Zawojski (born 1963), Polish media expert
Piotr Zborowski (died 1580), Polish–Lithuanian politician
Piotr Zbylitowski (1569–1649), Polish poet
Piotr Żemło (born 1995), Polish footballer
Piotr Zgorzelski (born 1963), Polish politician and teacher
Piotr Zieliński (born 1994), Polish footballer
Piotr Zioła (born 1995), Polish rock singer
Piotr Zychowicz (born 1980), Polish journalist and alternate history writer
Piotr Żyła (born 1987), Polish ski jumper

See also
Piotr i Paweł, Polish supermarket chain founded in 1990
List of people named Pyotr

References

Polish masculine given names